Ngaouyanga (also Gaoyanga, Goyanga) is a village in the commune of Mbe in the Adamawa Region of Cameroon. et le département de la Vina au Cameroun, on the road from Ngaoundéré to Mbe and Garoua.

Population 
In 1967, the settlement contained 667 inhabitants, mostly Duru. At the time of the 2005 census, there were 1598 people in the village.

Infrastructure 
There is a public school.

References

Bibliography 
 Jean Boutrais, 1993, Peuples et cultures de l'Adamaoua (Cameroun) : actes du colloque de Ngaoundéré du 14 au 16 janvier 1992, Paris : Éd. de l'ORSTOM u.a.
 Dictionnaire des villages de l'Adamaoua, ONAREST, Yaoundé, October 1974, 133 p.
 Tomas Sundnes Drønen, Communication and conversion in northern Cameroon: the Dii people and Norwegian missionaries, 1934-1960, Brill, Leiden, Boston, 2009, 234 p.

External links 

 Mbe, on the website Communes et villes unies du Cameroun (CVUC)

Populated places in Adamawa Region